Vicente Gómez Martínez-Espinel (28 December 15504 February 1624) was a Spanish writer and musician of the Siglo de Oro.
He is credited the creation of the modern poetic form of the décima, composed of ten octameters, named espinela in Spanish after him.

Biography
Espinel was born in Ronda. He studied at the University of Salamanca, where he adopted as his own his father's second surname, and later on at the universities of Granada and Alcalá. As a latinist, he translated to Spanish Horace's Epistola ad Pisones.

After leaving university, he had an adventurous life as a soldier, serving in Flanders and elsewhere. He was a prisoner of pirates at Argel and a soldier in Italy after being liberated, and returned to Spain about 1584. Afterwards, he moved to Madrid and took holy orders in 1589. Four years later he became chaplain at Ronda, but absented himself from his living. Still, his musical skill obtained for him the post of choirmaster at Plasencia.

His  (Assorted Rhymes), produced in 1591, showed a caustic wit. Later, in 1618, the printer Juan de la Cuesta published Espinel's picaresque novel , for which he is best known. This book, with several autobiographical details, was printed in France the same year and inspired later Lesage's Gil Blas de Santillana. Espinel also revived the measure known as décimas or espinelas, consisting of a stanza of ten octosyllabic lines.

Lope de Vega, who referred to Espinel as his teacher, dedicated him El caballero de Illescas (1602). Espinel also befriended Cervantes, Góngora (whose poetry he helped to publish) and Quevedo. Like his friends, he was a member of congregation Esclavos del Santísimo Sacramento. At the time of his death, he was the chaplain at Madrid, and also the music teacher of the Plasencia bishop.

His bust can be found in Ronda, the city of his birth, in the small Plaza de los Gigantes. His head is decorated with a laurel wreath.

References

Enciclopedia Libre Universal – Vicente Espinel (in Spanish)

External links
 
 

1550 births
1624 deaths
People from Ronda
Renaissance composers
Spanish male writers
University of Salamanca alumni
Male classical composers